Bikur cholim or Bikur holim ("visiting the sick") refers to the mitzvah (Jewish religious commandment) to visit and extend aid to the sick. By extension, it may also refer to any (typically local) Jewish organization that visits those in hospital or provides other services for them or their families. It also may refer specifically to any of the following.

Hospitals and medical organizations
 Bikur Cholim, also known as the Jewish Healthcare Foundation, a nonprofit healthcare organization in Greater Los Angeles, California
 Bikur Cholim Hospital, Jerusalem
 Satmar Bikur Cholim
 Sephardic Bikur Holim, a non-profit organization in New York and New Jersey.
 Bikur Cholim Chesed Organization of Borough Park
 Bikur Cholim of Greater Washington, a non-profit organization serving the Greater Washington DC region.

Synagogues and congregations

In Poland
 Bikur Cholim Synagogue, Limanowskiego 13, Kraków
 Bikur Cholim Synagogue, Stroma 11, Kraków

In the United States
 Congregation Beth Israel Bikur Cholim, New York City, New York
 Bikur Cholim B'nai Israel Synagogue, Swan Lake, New York
 Bikur Cholim Machzikay Hadath, Seattle, Washington, one of whose predecessor congregations was simply "Bikur Cholim"
 Bikur Cholim Synagogue, Bridgeport, Connecticut
 Congregation Bikur Cholim (Donaldson, Louisiana), a former congregation and synagogue built in 1872; the congregation disbanded in the 1940s.
 Sephardic Bikur Holim Congregation, Seattle, Washington